
The Fort Collins Colorado Temple is a temple of the Church of Jesus Christ of Latter-day Saints in Fort Collins, Colorado. Completed in 2016, the intent to construct the temple was announced by church president Thomas S. Monson on April 2, 2011, during the church's semi-annual general conference.

The temple is on the southeast corner of the intersection at Trilby Road and Timberline Road, across the Street from a Latter-day Saint chapel in Fort Collins. The new  structure in Fort Collins will serve the needs of more than 20,000 church members in Northern Colorado, Western Nebraska and Southern Wyoming.

The developers applied to rezone the land to accommodate a structure designed to service this tri-state region. The property was originally zoned to support only homes and neighborhood centers that, act "as a focal point for neighborhood activity," and may include, "a grocery store or supermarket and other neighborhood oriented retail services." Due to an intergovermental agreement between the Larimer County and the City of Fort Collins, the developer first pursued the rezoning through Larimer County, followed by an annexation and rezoning process through the City of Fort Collins.

In November 2011, the city planning board in Fort Collins recommended annexation and rezoning of the proposed temple site. Work on the temple commenced with a groundbreaking ceremony conducted by Ronald A. Rasband on August 24, 2013.

As construction progressed, the temple was vandalized on August 23, 2015, along with other places of worship in the local area. On August 26, 2015, a statue of the angel Moroni, similar to those that sit atop many LDS temples was put in place.

A public open house was held from August 19 through September 10, 2016, excluding Sundays. The temple was formally dedicated by Dieter F. Uchtdorf on October 16, 2016.

See also

 Comparison of temples of The Church of Jesus Christ of Latter-day Saints
 List of temples of The Church of Jesus Christ of Latter-day Saints
 List of temples of The Church of Jesus Christ of Latter-day Saints by geographic region
 Temple architecture (Latter-day Saints)
 The Church of Jesus Christ of Latter-day Saints in Colorado

References

External links
 
Fort Collins Colorado Temple Official site
Fort Collins Colorado Temple at ChurchofJesusChristTemples.org

Temples (LDS Church) in the United States
Religious buildings and structures in Colorado
21st-century Latter Day Saint temples
Buildings and structures in Fort Collins, Colorado
Religious buildings and structures completed in 2016
Latter Day Saint movement in Colorado
2016 in Christianity
2016 establishments in Colorado